Vaiyapuri (born 23 October 1968 as Ramakrishnan) is an Indian actor who has worked in Tamil-language films. He rose to fame by appearing in supporting roles in the late 1990s and early 2000s, often portraying supporting comedic characters. His first major role was in Balu Mahendra's Raman Abdullah (1997), while his roles in films including Thulladha Manamum Thullum (1999), Gemini (2002) and  Mani Ratnam's Raavanan (2010) also garnered him acclaim.

Career
In December 1986, Vaiyapuri moved from his hometown of Theni to Chennai hoping to become an actor in the Tamil film industry. Unable to immediately get a chance in films because of his skinny physical stature, he worked as a bearer at a hotel on Mount Road. Vaiyapuri's first break came through television serials on Doordarshan, where he notably worked on an adaptation of Sujatha's Kolaiyuthir Kalam. He started his film career appearing as an extra and then in minor roles in films, before making a breakthrough with his role in Balu Mahendra's comedy film Raman Abdullah (1997). The success of the film prompted several film makers to approach him for comedic roles in their projects, with the actor subsequently winning acclaim for his roles in Kadhal Palli (1997), Priyamudan (1998) and Kaathala Kaathala, where he collaborated with actor Kamal Haasan. In the late 1990s, he continued appearing as a supporting actor, often portraying one of the several comedians in a film. His work in Thulladha Manamum Thullum (1999), where he portrayed a comedic role of a man slowly becoming a transgender, won him further critical acclaim.

Throughout his career, Vaiyapuri has often appeared in films starring Kamal Haasan and the actor selected Vaiyapuri for a major supporting role in the actor's Mumbai Xpress (2005). Vaiyapuri was later cast as a transgender in Mani Ratnam's Raavanan (2010), which he described as a "major turning point" in his career. He shot for the film alongside an ensemble cast including Vikram and Aishwarya Rai, with the film winning critical acclaim upon release. In 2010, he announced that he was set to play the protagonist in a film directed by newcomer Devindiran, while he had also shot for a Malayalam film titled Kalyanamam Kalyanam where he portrayed the second lead. However neither film eventually had a theatrical release. In the 2010s, Vaiyapuri was cast in less films as the Tamil film industry generally moved away from including separate comedy tracks in films. He has since worked on more low-budget films in supporting roles, while continuing to regularly collaborate in films starring Kamal Haasan such as Uttama Villain (2015) and Papanasam (2015).

In 2017, Vaiyapuri received media attention for taking part in the reality television show Bigg Boss hosted by Kamal Haasan. After spending 84 days in the house, he was evicted in a poll by the public.

Filmography

Television

References

External links
 

Indian male film actors
Living people
Tamil comedians
People from Tamil Nadu
Male actors in Tamil cinema
21st-century Indian male actors
1968 births
Bigg Boss (Tamil TV series) contestants